Euptera aurantiaca, the Korup euptera, is a butterfly in the family Nymphalidae. It is found in Cameroon. The habitat consists of forests.

The larvae feed on Englerophytum species.

References

Endemic fauna of Cameroon
Euptera
Butterflies of Africa
Lepidoptera of Cameroon
Taxa named by Jean-Louis Amiet
Butterflies described in 1998